Siu Yam-yam (born 17 August 1950), born Ngai Siu-ngan (倪小雁), is a Hong Kong actress. She has been active in the Hong Kong film industry since 1970.

Filmography

The Calling of a Bus Driver (2019)
A Journey of Happiness (2019)
Missbehavior (2019)
A Lifetime Treasure (2019)
Dearest Anita (2019)
Hotel Soul Good (2018)
Special Region (2018)
Undercover vs. Undercover (2018)
Lucid Dreams (2018)
A Beautiful Moment (2018)
Vampire Cleanup Department (2017)
Happiness (2016)
Lazy Hazy Crazy (2015)
Are You Here (2015)
Full Strike (2015)
Two Thumbs Up (2015)
King of Mahjong (2015)
As the Light Goes Out (2014)
The Best Plan Is No Plan (2013)
Hardcore Comedy (2013)
Tales from the Dark 1 (2013)
SDU: Sex Duties Unit (2013)
Hotel Deluxe (2013)
I Love Hong Kong 2013 (2013)
Vulgaria (2012)
I Love Hong Kong 2012 (2012)
ICAC Investigators 2011 (2011)
I Love Hong Kong (2011)
Merry-Go-Round (2010)
Frozen (2010)
Gallants (2010)
True Women For Sale (2009)
Dongfang muqin (1997)
Confession of a Concubine (1976)
Love Swindlers (1976)

References

External links

Sui Yam Yam at hkcinemagic.com

1950 births
Living people
Hong Kong film actresses
Hong Kong television actresses
20th-century Hong Kong actresses
21st-century Hong Kong actresses